Sonny West may refer to:
 Sonny Boy West (1929–1950), American boxer
 Sonny West (musician) (1937–2022), American songwriter
 Sonny West (actor) (1938–2017), American actor and stuntman, friend and bodyguard of Elvis Presley